The Marquis bread wheat cultivar was developed by Dominion Agriculturalist Charles Saunders in 1904. It is a cross between Red Fife (male parent) and Hard Red Calcutta (female parent). It was selected for superiority in milling quality for bread flour over other cultivars then prevalent in western Canada. 'Marquis' had the advantage of maturing 10 days earlier than its competitors - a factor of great importance in the Canadian wheatbelt, extending as far south as southern Nebraska.

Notes

Wheat cultivars